Gandomban may refer to:
 Gandomban-e Olya
 Gandomban-e Sofla